Thomas James Bulkeley, 7th Viscount Bulkeley, later  Warren-Bulkeley, (12 December 1752 – 3 June 1822) was a Welsh aristocrat and politician who sat in the House of Commons from 1774 to 1784 when he was raised to the peerage.

Life
Thomas James Bulkeley was the posthumous son and heir to James Bulkeley, 6th Viscount Bulkeley, who died aged 35 in 1752. He was educated as fellow commoner at Jesus College, Oxford, before making the Grand Tour with the Marquess of Buckingham; he gave a copy of Guido Reni's St Michael subduing the Devil, acquired in Rome, to Jesus College chapel.

Like several of his ancestors, Bulkeley became member of parliament for the county of Anglesey, returned in 1774 and 1780. In 1777 he married Elizabeth Harriot, only daughter and heir of Sir George Warren. Though he voted against Fox's East India Bill in 1783, he attended a 1784 meeting of the St. Alban's Tavern group of MPs interested in uniting Fox and Pitt. In May 1784 he was created an English peer, Baron Bulkeley, of Beaumaris and had to vacate his seat in the House of Commons.

Bulkeley supported Pitt on the regency question in 1788. He spoke in the Lords on the election treating act in 1796. He opposed the 'Adultery bill' in 1800. In the 1806 impeachment trial of Viscount Melville, Bulkeley voted Melville guilty on the sixth and seventh charges.

In 1802 Bulkeley legally changed his name by Royal Licence to Thomas James Warren-Bulkeley. He died without issue in 1822 in Englefield Green. His wife died in 1832; her will left property to a relation George Fleming Leicester, under the condition he change his surname to Warren.

References

External links

1752 births
1822 deaths
Alumni of Jesus College, Oxford
British MPs 1774–1780
British MPs 1780–1784
Lord-Lieutenants of Caernarvonshire
Members of the Parliament of Great Britain for Welsh constituencies
Viscounts in the Peerage of Ireland
Thomas
Peers of Great Britain created by George III